Rach Behn is a union council of Abbottabad District in Khyber-Pakhtunkhwa province of Pakistan. According to the 2017 Census of Pakistan, the population is 4,720.

Subdivisions
Banda Jaghian
Chatrhi
Richh Bhen
Sohlan Bala
Sohlan Tarli
Thathi Faqir Sahib

References

Union councils of Abbottabad District